Lowertown Historic District can refer to:
 Lowertown Historic District (Lockport, New York)
 Lowertown Historic District (St. Paul, Minnesota)